White Lightning was a brand of English white cider produced from the early 1990s to 2009.

Origin
White Lightning was originally manufactured in the early 1990s by Inch's Cider of Winkleigh. Inch's Cider was bought out by H. P. Bulmer in 1995, and in spite of initial assurances that production would continue in Winkleigh, the cider brewery there was shut and all production moved to Hereford. Bulmers was in turn acquired by Scottish Courage in 2003.

Commercial success
White Lightning quickly gained brand recognition in the late 1990s-2000s in a competitive marketplace with its distinctive large deep blue coloured thin plastic bottle's design, very low price and high strength, making it popular with those seeking strong alcohol with minimal money to spend. On its release, its strength was 7.5% alcohol by volume, although labelled as 8.4%. UK alcohol taxation provided a price-break for ciders up to 7.5%, which fuelled the original development of the white cider market. However makers were allowed to over-state this strength on product labels, up to 8.4%.

After 1996 this law was reviewed. White Lightning was then sold at either 7.5% or 8.4%, the 8.4% now being slightly stronger, but having a higher price owing to the greater duty paid.

With gathering evidence of its adverse social effects that were becoming apparent, Heineken, the new owners of Scottish Courage, wished to distance themselves from the perceived negative impression of White Lightning. The price was gradually increased and the strength was finally reduced to 5.5% in May 2009.

Production discontinued
At the end of 2009, Heineken decided to discontinue its manufacture due to its brand image problem in the United Kingdom as having become synonymous with under-age drinking, anti-social behaviour, homelessness and impoverished alcoholism, in an echo of the Gin Craze of the 18th century. Such cheap non-distilled drinks (both high-strength beer and cider) became known as "tramp juice" in the UK media. When sold on special at Off licences, 3 litre plastic bottles of 8.4% White Lightning could be purchased for less than £2.

Cultural references
White Lightning is referenced negatively in both Jake Bugg's Two Fingers, singer-songwriter Jamie T's 2009 hit Sticks 'n' Stones, and The Black Lips' 2014 single Boys In The Wood. The Ska-punk band Shootin' Goon was sponsored by White Lightning in its tours. The Gorillaz song "White Light" is also interpreted as referring to White Lightning, as do English band Enter Shikari in the song "Hectic" from the 2009 album Common Dreads. Corporal Machine and the Bombers also released a track called "The days of White lightening" in reference  to the role it played for the band growing up in working class east London.

Inch's Cider
In 2021, Heineken (the owner of H. P. Bulmer) relaunched the Inch's Cider name as a sustainable cider brand with a 4.5% medium cider available in the United Kingdom in cans, bottles and on draught.

References 

Brands of cider
British alcoholic drinks
English ciders